Oberea ophidiana is a species of beetle in the family Cerambycidae. It was described by Francis Polkinghorne Pascoe in 1858. It is known from the Philippines and Borneo.

References

Beetles described in 1858
ophidiana